HNLMS Zeehond may refer to following ships of the Royal Netherlands Navy:

 , ex-
 , ex-
 , a 

Royal Netherlands Navy ship names